{{Automatic taxobox
| image              = Llimonaea sorediata Jymm.jpg
| image_caption      = Llimonaea sorediata
| taxon = Llimonaea
| authority    = Egea & Torrente
| type_species       = Llimonaea occulta| type_species_authority = Egea & Torrente
| subdivision_ranks  = Species
| subdivision        = 
}}Llimonaea''' is a genus of fungi within the Arthoniales order. The genus has been placed into Opegraphaceae.

The genus name of Llimonaea'' is in honour of Xavier Llimona (1943 - x), who was a Spanish (Catalonian) botanist (Lichenology and Mycologp) and Professor of Botany at the University of Barcelona.

The genus was circumscribed by José Maria Egea Fernández and P. Torrente in Nova Hedwigia vol.52 on page 239 in 1991.

References

Arthoniomycetes
Lichen genera
Arthoniomycetes genera